Chevonne Furbert (born 25 November 1970) is a former Bermudian woman cricketer. She was a member of the Bermudian cricket team in the 2008 Women's Cricket World Cup Qualifier.

References

External links 
 

1970 births
Living people
Bermudian women cricketers